Alimi Alan Goitia  (born June 28, 1970, in Venezuela) is a Venezuelan former professional boxer who competed from 1993 to 2005. He won the World Boxing Association super flyweight title in 1995.

Professional career

Goitia turned professional in 1993 and compiled a record of 11-0 before facing and defeating South Korean boxer Lee Hyung-chul, to win the WBA Super flyweight title. He would face Lee again in rematch, this time winning via 12th round stoppage  He would lose go on to lose the title to Thai contender Yokthai Sithoar. In his final fight he would lose to future world champion Cristian Mijares.

Professional boxing record

See also
List of world super-flyweight boxing champions

References

External links

 

1970 births
Living people
Venezuelan male boxers
People from Puerto Cabello
Super-flyweight boxers
World super-flyweight boxing champions
World Boxing Association champions